is a former Nippon Professional Baseball player for the Chiba Lotte Marines of Japan's Pacific League.

External links

1977 births
Chiba Lotte Marines players
Japanese baseball players
Living people
Lotte Giants players
Nippon Professional Baseball first basemen
Nippon Professional Baseball shortstops
Nippon Professional Baseball third basemen
Baseball people from Sendai